The Roman temple of Bziza  is a well-preserved first century AD building dedicated to Azizos, a personification of the morning star in the Canaanite mythology. This Roman temple lends the modern Lebanese town of Bziza its current name as Bziza is a corruption of Beth Azizo meaning the house or temple of Azizos. Azizos is identified as Ares by Julian the Apostate.

The tetrastyle prostyle building has two doors that connect the pronaos to a square cella. To the back of the temple lie the remains of the adyton  where images of the deity once stood. The ancient temple functioned as an aedes, the dwelling place of the deity. The temple of Bziza was converted into a church and underwent architectural modification during two phases of Christianization; in the Early Byzantine period and later in the Middle Ages. The church, colloquially known until modern times as the Lady of the Pillars, fell into disrepair. Despite the church's condition, Christian devotion was still maintained in the nineteenth century in one of the temple's niches.

The temple of Bziza is featured on multiple stamps issued by the Lebanese state.

History

Historical background 
In 64 BC, the Roman general Pompey annexed Phoenicia to the Roman province of Syria after years of disorderly power vacuum caused by the Seleucid dynastic wars. In his treatise on Phoenician history, Byblian writer Philo maintained that the gods and goddesses venerated in Phoenicia were Hellenized Phoenician deities. The wave of cultural Hellenization created pan-Phoenician patriotism and a deeper attachment to pre-Hellenic religious traditions. Phoenician devotion to ancient gods continued under Roman rule as described in the  [On the Syrian Goddess] treatise by second century AD rhetor Lucian of Samosata. Lucian visited sacred cities of Syria, Phoenicia and the Libanus where numerous mountain sanctuaries were spreading all over the countryside. Temple building, urbanization and monumentalization of cities was financed by generous endowments of client kings and wealthy citizens seeking to increase their power and sphere of influence. The prosperity of Roman Phoenicia was in turn fueled by maritime export and the elevation of numerous Phoenician cities to the status of Roman colony, giving the inhabitants Roman citizenship.

Construction 
The temple of Bziza was built during the Julio-Claudian dynasty in the first century AD, at a time when Roman hegemony over the region was still being consolidated. The Phoenicians perpetuated the ancient tradition of building high-altitude sanctuaries and sacred precincts. Temples were situated on or overlooking mountain summits that were believed to be sacred dwellings of the gods and giants, guarded by archaic men and wild beasts. Under the influence of suzerain powers, Phoenician temples were Hellenized then Romanized while maintaining balance between foreign elements and Semitic architectural archetypes, among which are tower altars, temenoi and cellas with elevated adytons. The temple of Bziza adheres to this model, which characterized Romanized Phoenician temples.

Decline 
A policy of repression and persecution of paganism was initiated during the reign of Constantine I when he ordered the pillaging and destruction of Roman temples. Constantine's son Constantius II issued a series of decrees that enforced the formal persecution of pagans; he ordered the closing of all pagan temples and forbade pagan sacrifices under pain of death. Under his reign ordinary Christians began to vandalise pagan temples, tombs and monuments.

The temple of Bziza was converted into a church during the early Byzantine period between the fifth and sixth century and underwent further structural modifications during the Middle Ages between the twelfth and the thirteenth century. It is colloquially known as the Church of Our Lady of the Pillars.

Modern history 

In 1838, French orientalist painters Antoine-Alphonse Montfort and  visited and painted the temple ruins. In 1860, French Semitic languages and civilizations expert Ernest Renan visited the temple; he explained that the Toponymy of Bziza as a corruption of the Phoenician Beth (or Beit) Azizo and attributed the town's temple to Azizos. Flemish Jesuit orientalist Henri Lammens, who taught at Beirut's Saint Joseph University at the time, also visited the site in 1894 and took a photograph of the temple ruins. Nineteenth-century paintings and early twentieth-century photographs show the removed chapel remains and the oak tree that took root inside of the temple.

In the early twentieth century, German architectural historian Daniel Krencker conducted a survey of the site, later publishing his findings with the assistance of archaeologist  in the book Römische Tempel in Syrien ("Roman Temples in Syria"). According to Krencker the chapel had been in ruins for a long time and a Christian devotion was still maintained in the nineteenth century in the "niche near the door".

In 1965, the site was further excavated by Lebanese-Armenian archaeologist Harutune Kalayan, uncovering the podium and an architectural plan of half of the front pediment etched on one of the temple walls. In the 1990s, the Lebanese Directorate General of Antiquities cleared away parts of the chapel during restoration works to highlight the remains of the ancient temple; only the apses and a rectangular masonry pillar from the Christian chapel remain.

The temple ruins of Bziza were featured on the 35 Lebanese piasters postage stamp in 1971, and on the 200 Lebanese piasters postage stamp in 1985. It appeared again on a 2002 Lebanese postage stamp.

Azizos 

Azizos (ʿzyz) was the Canaanite god of the morning star; German biblical scholar Paul de Lagarde showed that Lucifer was one of the god's appellations. In a Dacian inscription, Azizos is given the title  [the good young god Phosphorus]. He is portrayed in the ancient Syrian city of Palmyra as a horseman, accompanied by his cameleer twin brother Arsu (also called Monimos in later writings). Arsu is believed by Teixidor to be a personification of the evening star. Both gods were regarded as the protectors of traders. In Emperor Julian's work "Hymn to King Helios", Azizos is depicted as the counterpart of the Greek god of war Ares, and Monimos was equated with Hermes, the god of trade and travelers. According to the Julian, the Phoenician cult of Azizos and Monimos was associated with that of Helios in the ancient city of Emesus; he also recounts that Azizos precedes Helios in sacred processions.

Evidence that Aziz, and more frequently Azizu, was used as a common and royal given name is abundant in Palmyrene and Emesan inscriptions. Another Latinized form, Azizus, was found in Roman military parchments and papyri. In the Semitic language, the root ʿzyz means "mighty" or "powerful". The female counterpart of ʿAziz is the goddess ʿOzzā, who was worshiped by Semites and was one of the three chief goddesses of the pre-Islamic Arabian religion.

Location 

Architecture and description 

The Bziza temple is a well-preserved tetrastyle prostyle with Ionic order detailing. The pronaos is oriented to the northwest; it is fronted by unfluted columns standing on bases carved in the Attic style. Three of the temple's monolithic pronaos columns still stand, the fourth, found on the temple's northern corner was broken in two parts and was re-erected during restoration works. The columns are crowned with Ionic capitals supporting a frieze that extends over three of the four columns. The space between the central columns is wider than that between the distal columns. The colonnade was added at a later stage of the temple's construction as indicated by the style of the ionic capitals that adheres to the model found in Syria and Anatolia as of the second century AD. The pronaos is well preserved, it is framed by short antae ending with angular pilasters that are repeated at the rear of the building. The temple was accessible from a stairway that was dismantled.

The pronaos is connected to the cella by two entrances: a massive, richly decorated central door and a smaller side door located to the left of the main entrance. The jambs of the main door are adorned with fasciae. The decoration of the lintel and the entablature is finely realized with three fasciae adorned with a rich vegetal decoration. The cornice features modillions bearing images of two diagonally aligned small Victories on either angle of the cornice. The large door's dripstones are in the Corinthian order. The temple's smaller door has only two fasciae. The lintel is decorated with a frieze and a Corinthian dripstone.

The cella consists of two chambers, the first of which is roughly square followed by an adyton to the back of the building. On either side of the temple's cella walls are niches once used to house statues. The two niches of the right cella wall remain. The first niche is surmounted by the form of a scallop; the other one is plain and rectangular. Small columns stood in front of the niches; these supported a simple architrave and an archivolt with three fasciae. Traces of the adyton's platform are visible at the back of the temple. The adyton is recognizable by the remains of two pilasters with Attic style bases in the southwestern wall.

Kalayan noted that the exterior of the southwest cella wall bears marks of an architectural sketch for the assembly of the temple's pronaos half-pediment. Another engraved sketch shows the plan of the temple's entablature. Excavations undertaken by Kalayan revealed an elevated podium that was not noted in Krencker's survey. The uncompleted podium spans the southwestern side of the temple and is structurally independent from the temple's foundation. This addition indicates an unfinished plan to transform the prostyle temple into a peripteros.

In Byzantine times a church was built within the temple walls. The building's orientation was changed from the northwest to the east; the main door of the temple was walled, and a new doorway was opened in the southwest wall of the cella. The adyton's platform and back wall were dismantled and the northeast wall was replaced by a double apse. A molding separates the apse wall from the semi-dome above. The quality of the stereotomy of the apses is comparable to that of the ancient reused temple blocks; the apses date, according to Krencker and Zschietzschmann, to the early Byzantine period.

Further modifications were made to the church in the Middle Ages. A  rectangular masonry pillar was added to the adjoining wall of the two apses. There were three other similar pillars in the north, west and south corners of the cella that were removed during the 1990s restoration of the temple. The pillars supported groin vaults covering the two naves of the medieval chapel. Two 1838 paintings of the facade of the temple depict a gate arranged in the central intercolumnation of the pronaos. At the beginning of the twentieth century, only the left-hand side of the gate remained as demonstrated by a photograph taken during that period. Lebanese-Armenian archaeologist Levon Nordiguian suggests that the pronaos could have served as a church narthex or may have been reserved exclusively for women worshipers through this separate access door.

As well as architectural alterations, several Christian cross engravings were found in the temple. The cross variants provide information on different stages of the site's Christianization. A Latin cross and several bifid crosses similar to the East Syriac variant were found in the temple. Some of the bifid crosses are enclosed in circles. Subterranean rock-carved tombs were found to the south of the temple.

Function 

The origin of the modern word temple is the Latin templum. The word templum, however, designates the sacred precinct within which the aedes (shrine or temple) was built. The aedes' main function was to house the cult image of the divinity, which was typically placed in the adyton of the Roman temples in Lebanon. The adyton is the innermost chamber of the temple, located at the back of the cella. The temple of Bziza is an aedes that follows this arrangement; its elevated adyton was reached through a flight of steps. Roman worship was not conducted within the aedes itself as the building did not have a congregational function like the places of worship of modern monotheistic religions; the aedes was only accessible to priests, augurs, and privileged individuals. Roman religious rituals and sacrifices were conducted on an altar, consecrated to the temple's deity, that was always located outside at the front of the aedes where worshipers gathered. This arrangement reflects the public nature of Roman religious offices, contrasting with the private character of modern religious services. In the temple yard, worshipers would face the aedes' doorway, within sight of the deity's image. 

In his treatise on architecture, the Roman architect Marcus Vitruvius Pollio pronounced a rule for the alignment of temples:

The temple of Bziza is one of the few Roman temples in Lebanon to adhere to this rule as the temple is oriented to the northwest; in Bziza, the cult image was lit by the setting sun through the temple entrance.

See also
List of Ancient Roman temples

Notes 

Phoenican cities that became Roman colonies: Beirut (colonia Iulia Augusta Felix Berytus), Baalbek (colonia Iulia Augusta Felix Heliopolis), Acre (colonia Claudia Stabilis Germanica Ptolemais Felix), Tyre (colonia Septimia Tyrus), Sidon (colonia Aurelia Pia metropolis Sidoniorum), Arqa (colonia Caesarea ad Libanum).
 Renan explained in his report:  [In Lebanon, the initial B (Bteda, Bteddin, Bhadidat, etc.) is generally an abbreviation of Beth. Likewise, in the Gemara, "" for "".] In a later chapter he affirmed his previous interpretation:  [The initial B is without a doubt a corruption of Beth which was preserved in [the town names of] Bziza = Beth-Aziz, Beschtoudar = Beth-Aschtar, Berbaschtar = Deir Beth-Aschtar.] (Renan 1864). This toponymy and temple attribution was upheld by later historians and Onomastolgy experts.
 Bziza is pronounced Bzizo in the mountain villages of North Lebanon due to the survival of the Canaanite shift of the vowel (ā) to (ō).
Viz. coordinates.

References

Bibliography
 
 
 
 
 
 
 
 
 
 
 
 
 
 
 
 
 
 
 
 
 
 
 
 
 
 
 
 
 
 
 
 
 
 
 
 
 
 
 
 
 
 
 
 
 
 
 
 
 
 
 

1st-century Roman temples
Archaeological sites in Lebanon
Roman sites in Lebanon
Conversion of non-Christian religious buildings and structures into churches
Temples in Lebanon
Phoenician temples